Van Hemessen is a surname. Notable people with the surname include:

 Catharina van Hemessen (1528–after 1565), Flemish painter, daughter of Jan
 Jan Sanders van Hemessen (1500–1566), Flemish painter